Yapham Gate railway station was a station on the York to Beverley Line in the East Riding of Yorkshire, England. It opened on 4 October 1847 and served the village of Yapham. It was short lived and closed in April 1865.

References

External links
 

Disused railway stations in the East Riding of Yorkshire
Former York and North Midland Railway stations
Railway stations in Great Britain opened in 1847
Railway stations in Great Britain closed in 1865
1847 establishments in England